"When You Gonna Learn" is a song by British funk/acid jazz band Jamiroquai, released as their debut single. It was originally released in 1992 by Acid Jazz Records before being re-released on Sony Records in 1993 as the lead single from the band's debut studio album, Emergency on Planet Earth (1993). The lyrical themes, like many of Jamiroquai's early songs, speak of environmental awareness and unfettered capitalism.

History
The demo was recorded without didgeridoo player Wallis Buchanan. While the most commonly known version of the song lasts for 3:50, and can be found on the band's album, another, longer version exists. Known as the "JK mix", it lasts for 6:20 and appears on the vinyl version of the Emergency on Planet Earth album as well as on the "When You Gonna Learn?" and "Blow Your Mind" singles.

Samples
"When You Gonna Learn" was not actually the first single written and issued by Jay Kay, although it is the first single as Jamiroquai. Kay's first single was a white-label acetate called "Natural Energy", which was pressed only in three copies. Kiss 100 FM was the first radio station to play the single, in the summer of 1992. The chord progressions of the song bear a striking resemblance to the chord progressions of a Johnny "Hammond" Smith track called "Los Conquistadores Chocolatés", taken from his 1975 album Gears.
The booklet of the Acid Jazz Records release of the single bears a "special thanks" note to Smith, who gave permission to Kay to use the composition's structure. It is unknown whether Hammond received any royalties. "Natural Energy" can be found on YouTube.

  
The chord progressions of the Cantè Hondo Mix of the song bear even more resemblance to "Los Conquistadores Chocolatés". The Cantè Hondo Mixes also uses the wind sound effect from Hammond's song. The cover used by Acid Jazz Records is completely different from the cover on Sony's release, although a Spanish promo issued by Sony bears the Acid Jazz Records cover. There have been legal disputes between Acid Jazz Records and Epic Records because Epic re-released the single without Acid Jazz Records' consent.

Critical reception
Larry Flick from Billboard felt that the UK nouveau-soul artist "kicks a hearty vocal performance, amid a stack of brassy horns and jiggly funk guitars. Comparisons to Simply Red are in the offing, even though J's composition has a more jazz-injected tone." He also wrote that he thought it was a "wonderfully creative and accessible shoulder-shaker". Dave Sholin from the Gavin Report said, "Music with a message can be exciting. Woven into this retro-melody are some disturbing yet thought-provoking lyrics about the state of our environment." Pan-European magazine Music & Media commented, "Hats off for J.K.'s original idea to introduce a digeridoo to '70s soul. Even better are the intelligent anti-war lyrics. Perhaps Arafat and Rabin have received a copy." Andy Beevers from Music Week gave "When You Gonna Learn" five out of five, stating that "this is arguably his best song". James Hamilton from the RM Dance Update described it as a "Stevie Wonder-ish "Johannesburg"-style jogger with strange didgeridoo and strings woven rare groove-type [song]". Also Tom Doyle from Smash Hits rated it four out of five, declaring it as a "brilliant eco-friendly dance tune", noting "its lazy rare groovy feel and top lyrics about the mindless exploitation of the planet". The magazine's Pete Stanton remarked that it "feature a multitude of enticing grooves (plus plenty of do-do-do-dad-dos)."

Music video
A music video was shot for "When You Gonna Learn". It was directed by Morgan Lawley and interspersed artistic shots of lead singer Jay Kay as well as footage of the band playing while graphic stock footage of animals being experimented on and whaling operations are intercut within the video. The original version was banned from MTV because of the confronting imagery; it was replaced with a "cleaner" edit. The uncut video can be viewed on YouTube. When Kay talked about the video in an interview, he stated that it had been his intention to make an intense 'shock video', depicting various experiments done on animals, whaling operations, and the Nazis, all in the most negative light: "I remember I did the video in America, and I remember the video got banned—you know, the video got banned. Well, because I just went to Greenpeace and just took loads of footage of stuff... stuff that I just didn't think was right. So, well, they [the American censors] said, 'Hey, we can't play that; it's got, like, the Nazi party in there—we can't play that' ". He also said in 1993 that "I wasn't trying to compare it to environmental issues. But I put in those images of the Holocaust because if you can't see that Nazism is on the rise, if you don't remind people, then it's just going to come back."

Track listing

 Acid Jazz Records CD single
 "When You Gonna Learn" (Digeridoo) – 3:47
 "When You Gonna Learn" (Digeridon't) – 3:55
 "When You Gonna Learn" (JK Extended Mix) – 6:20
 "When You Gonna Learn" (Canté Hondo Mix) – 5:47
 "When You Gonna Learn" (Original Demo) – 4:50
 "When You Gonna Learn" (Canté Hondo Instrumental) – 5:47

 Acid Jazz Records 12" vinyl
 "When You Gonna Learn" (JK Extended Mix) – 6:20
 "When You Gonna Learn" (JK Instrumental) – 6:20
 "When You Gonna Learn" (Canté Hondo Mix) – 5:47
 "When You Gonna Learn" (Original Demo) – 4:50
 "When You Gonna Learn" (Digeridoo Instrumental) – 6:28

 Acid Jazz Records 7" vinyl
 "When You Gonna Learn" (Digeridoo) – 3:47
 "When You Gonna Learn" (Digeridon't) – 3:55

 Sony Records CD single
 "When You Gonna Learn" (Digeridoo) – 3:47
 "Didgin' Out" (Live at the Milky Way, Amsterdam) – 3:27
 "Too Young to Die" (Live at Leadmill, Sheffield) – 5:25
 "When You Gonna Learn" (Canté Hondo Mix) – 5:47

 Sony Records Cassette single
 "When You Gonna Learn" (Digeridoo) – 3:47
 "Didgin' Out" (Live at the Milky Way, Amsterdam) – 3:27

 Sony Records 12" vinyl
 "When You Gonna Learn" (JK Extended Mix) – 6:20
 "When You Gonna Learn" (JK Instrumental) – 6:20
 "When You Gonna Learn" (Live at Leadmill, Sheffield) – 9:50
 "When You Gonna Learn" (Canté Hondo Mix) – 5:47
 "When You Gonna Learn" (Original Demo) – 4:50
 "When You Gonna Learn" (Digeridoo Instrumental) – 6:28

 Australian CD single / American CD single / American 12" vinyl
 "When You Gonna Learn" (Digeridoo) – 3:47
 "When You Gonna Learn" (Digeridon't) – 3:55
 "When You Gonna Learn" (JK Extended Mix) – 6:20
 "When You Gonna Learn" (Canté Hondo Mix) – 5:47
 "When You Gonna Learn" (Original Demo) – 4:50
 "When You Gonna Learn" (Digeridoo Instrumental) – 6:28

 American promotional CD single
 "When You Gonna Learn" (Digeridoo Edit) – 2:57
 "When You Gonna Learn" (Digeridon't Edit) – 3:01

 Japanese CD single
 "When You Gonna Learn" (Digeridoo) – 3:47
 "Too Young To Die" (7" Edit) – 3"22
 "When You Gonna Learn" (Canté Hondo Mix) – 5:47
 "Too Young To Die" (12" Version) – 6:04

Charts

References

1992 songs
1992 debut singles
1993 singles
Jamiroquai songs
Songs against racism and xenophobia
Protest songs
Songs written by Jason Kay
Epic Records singles
S2 Records singles
Music Week number-one dance singles